Ja'far ibn Ahmad al-Mu'tamid (Arabic: جعفر بن أحمد المعتمد), better known by his laqab al-Mufawwid ila-llah, was a son of the Abbasid caliph al-Mu'tamid and heir-apparent of the Caliphate from 875 until his sidelining by his cousin al-Mu'tadid in 891.

Life 

Ja'far ibn al-Mu'tamid is first mentioned on al-Tabari's history in 872. Al-Mufawwid was thus nominally responsible for Ifriqiya, Egypt, Syria, the Jazira and Mosul, Armenia, Mihrajanqadhaq and Hulwan, with Musa ibn Bugha as his deputy. Nevertheless, it was al-Muwaffaq who held the actual power in the state, and this division of authority seems to have been mostly on paper; according to Hugh N. Kennedy, "it does not seem that al-Mufawwaḍ [sic] exercised any real authority".

When al-Mu'tamid left Samarra in March 876 to lead the army south to confront the Saffarid army in what would be the Battle of Dayr al-'Aqul, al-Mufawwid was left behind to supervise the capital, with the aid of Muhammad al-Muwallad. In 882/3, when al-Mufawwaq and the powerful autonomous governor of Egypt, Ibn Tulun, fell out and open conflict broke out among them, al-Muwaffad was obliged to publicly curse and deprive his nominal subordinate Ibn Tulun of his offices, which went to the governor of Mosul, Ishaq ibn Kundaj. In the event, however, Ibn Tulun prevailed over the Abbasid attacks and remained in charge of Egypt, as did his son Khumarawayh after him.

In April 891, while al-Muwaffaq lay dying, an attempt was made to prevent the succession to the regency of his son, Abu'l-Abbas. Al-Muwaffaq had imprisoned his son for an unknown reason, and the governor of Baghdad tried to ensure that he would not be released, and secretly brought both the Caliph and al-Mufawwid into the city to capitalize on al-Muwaffaq's imminent death. The attempt failed due to the support Abu'l-Abbas enjoyed both among the populace and the army: Abu'l-Abbas was released by the troops, the governor's house was ransacked by the mob, and on 4 June, two days after al-Mufawwaq's death, the oath of allegiance was renewed, including Abu'l-Abbas, now under the title , as second heir after al-Mufawwid. Finally, on 30 April 892, al-Muwaffad was removed from the succession altogether, and when al-Mu'tamid died in October, he was succeeded by al-Mu'tadid.

See also
 Abdallah ibn al-Mu'tazz an Abbasid Prince, political figure and leading Arabic poet.
 Al-Mutanabbi greatest, most prominent and most influential poets in the Arabic language

References

Sources 
 
 
 
 

9th-century births
Sons of Abbasid caliphs
Heirs apparent who never acceded
Year of death unknown
9th-century Arabs
9th-century people from the Abbasid Caliphate